Cantherhines is a genus of filefishes.

Species

There are currently 12 recognized species in this genus:
 Cantherhines cerinus J. E. Randall, 2011
 Cantherhines dumerilii Hollard, 1854 (Whitespotted filefish)
 Cantherhines fronticinctus Günther, 1867 (Spectacled filefish)
 Cantherhines longicaudus Hutchins & J. E. Randall, 1982
 Cantherhines macrocerus Hollard, 1853 (American whitespotted filefish)
 Cantherhines multilineatus S. Tanaka (I), 1918
 Cantherhines nukuhiva J. E. Randall, 2011
 Cantherhines pardalis Rüppell, 1837 (Honeycomb filefish)
 Cantherhines pullus Ranzani, 1842 (Orange-spotted filefish)
 Cantherhines rapanui F. de Buen, 1963 (Rapanui filefish)
 Cantherhines sandwichiensis Quoy & Gaimard, 1824 (Sandwich isle file)
 Cantherhines verecundus E. K. Jordan, 1925 (Shy filefish)

References

Monacanthidae
Marine fish genera
Taxa named by William John Swainson